Ans Gravesteijn (born 3 January 1951) is a Dutch rower. She competed in the women's coxed four event at the 1976 Summer Olympics.

References

1951 births
Living people
Dutch female rowers
Olympic rowers of the Netherlands
Rowers at the 1976 Summer Olympics
Sportspeople from Gouda, South Holland